Palaeophanes brevispina is a species of moth in the family Arrhenophanidae. It is only known from Brunei.

The length of the forewings is about 6 mm for males.

Etymology
The specific epithet is said to derived from the Latin brevi (short) and spina (thorn), in reference to the diagnostic short, subapical spine on the male valva. The proper word in classical Latin for "short" is however brevis (masculine/feminine) or breve (neuter).

References

External links
Family Arrhenophanidae

Arrhenophanidae
Moths described in 2003